César Díaz (born 20 September 1978) is a Belgian-Guatemalan film director, screenwriter and editor. 

Born and raised in Guatemala City, Díaz moved to Belgium in 1998 as a student at the Free University of Brussels. After developing an interest in filmmaking, he enrolled at the La Fémis film school in Paris and studied screenwriting. Since the mid-2000s, Díaz has worked on a number of documentary films, before making his feature-length debut in 2019 with Our Mothers. The film premiered at the 2019 Cannes Film Festival, where Díaz won the Caméra d'Or.

Our Mothers received the André Cavens Award for Best Film given by the Belgian Film Critics Association (UCC) and was selected as the Belgian entry for the Best International Feature Film at the 92nd Academy Awards. It received six nominations at the 10th Magritte Awards, including Best Film and Best Director for Díaz, winning Best First Feature Film.

References

External links

1978 births
Living people
Belgian film directors
Belgian screenwriters
Belgian editors
Guatemalan film directors
Université libre de Bruxelles alumni
Guatemalan screenwriters
Male screenwriters